Moon Over Miami is an American crime drama television series that aired on ABC from September 15 until December 1, 1993.

Premise
Gwen Cross (Ally Walker) runs away from her own wedding, and private detective Walter Tatum (Bill Campbell) is hired to find her. Wanting her life to take a new direction, Gwen suggests that she work as a secretary for Walter's firm. Walter's father and grandfather were jazz musicians, and jazz music is a recurring theme of the series.

Cast
 Billy Campbell – Walter Tatum
 Ally Walker – Gwen Cross
 Agustin Rodriguez – Tito
 Marlo Marron – Billie

Production and broadcast 
The series was canceled after ten of the thirteen episodes produced were aired. The show ranked 58th for the season. The remaining three episodes were aired across Europe, where the show generally proved more popular; the entire run aired on BBC One in a mid-afternoon slot in the United Kingdom in 1996, with a repeat run on BBC Two in the mornings the following year.

Episodes

External links
 
 

1993 American television series debuts
1993 American television series endings
1990s American crime drama television series
American Broadcasting Company original programming
English-language television shows
Television shows set in Miami
Television series by ABC Studios
Television series by Sony Pictures Television